The following lists events that happened during  1956 in New Zealand.

Population
 Estimated population as of 31 December: 2,209,200
 Increase since 31 December 1955: 44,400 (2.05%)
 Males per 100 females: 101.2

Incumbents

Regal and viceregal
Head of State – Elizabeth II
Governor-General – Lieutenant-General The Lord Norrie GCMG GCVO CB DSO MC.

Government
The 31st New Zealand Parliament continued. In power was the National government under Sidney Holland.

Speaker of the House – Mathew Oram
Prime Minister – Sidney Holland.
Deputy Prime Minister – Keith Holyoake.
Minister of Finance – Jack Watts.
Minister of Foreign Affairs – Tom Macdonald.
Attorney-General – Jack Marshall.
Chief Justice — Sir Harold Barrowclough

Parliamentary opposition 
 Leader of the Opposition –   Walter Nash (Labour).

Main centre leaders
Mayor of Auckland – John Luxford, followed by Thomas Ashby
Mayor of Hamilton – Roderick Braithwaite
Mayor of Wellington – Robert Macalister, followed by Frank Kitts
Mayor of Christchurch – Robert M. Macfarlane
Mayor of Dunedin – Leonard Morton Wright

Events 

 8 March: Opo the friendly Dolphin dies in the Hokianga.
 13 March – After 26 years playing international cricket the New Zealand wins its first ever test victory against the West Indies at Eden Park.
 New Zealand troops are sent to Malaya.
 Roxburgh Dam is opened.
 Temperzone manufacturing is founded.

Arts and literature

See 1956 in art, 1956 in literature

Music

See: 1956 in music

Radio

See: Public broadcasting in New Zealand

Film

See: :Category:1956 film awards, 1956 in film, List of New Zealand feature films, Cinema of New Zealand, :Category:1956 films

Sport

Athletics
Albert Richards wins his first national title in the men's marathon, clocking 2:31:46 in Christchurch.

Chess
 The 63rd National Chess Championship was held in Dunedin, and was won by F.A. Foulds of Auckland.

Horse racing

Harness racing
 New Zealand Trotting Cup – Thunder
 Auckland Trotting Cup – Unite

Lawn bowls
The national outdoor lawn bowls championships are held in Dunedin.
 Men's singles champion – G.G. Littlejohn (Hutt Bowling Club)
 Men's pair champions – L.J. Hughes, E.H. Ravenwood (skip) (North-East Valley Bowling Club)
 Men's fours champions – P.C.F. Barrat, C.E. Tomlinson, L.J. Buckingham, Robbie Robson (skip) (Mangakino Bowling Club)

Olympic Games

Summer Olympics

Winter Olympics
 New Zealand did not participate in the 1956 Winter Olympics.

Soccer
 The Chatham Cup is won by Stop Out (Lower Hutt) who beat Shamrock (soccer) of Christchurch 4–1 in the final.
 Provincial league champions:
	Auckland:	Onehunga
	Bay of Plenty:	Rangers
	Buller:	Millerton Thistle
	Canterbury:	Western
	Hawke's Bay:	Napier Athletic
	Manawatu:	Kiwi United
	Marlborough:	Blenheim B
	Nelson:	Settlers
	Northland:	Kamo Swifts
	Otago:	Northern AFC
	Poverty Bay:	Eastern Union
	South Canterbury:	West End
	Southland:	Brigadiers
	Taranaki:	Moturoa
	Waikato:	Huntly Thistle
	Wairarapa:	No competition
	Wanganui:	Technical College Old Boys
	Wellington:	Stop Out

Births
 3 January: Judith Tizard, politician
 6 January: Stephen Cox, cyclist
 16 January: Mark Burton, politician
 4 February: Gerry Brownlee, politician
 16 February: Vincent Ward, film director
 1 March: Mark Todd, equestrian eventer
 3 March: John F. Reid, cricketer
 13 April: Peter 'Possum' Bourne, rally driver
 17 April: Jaynie Parkhouse, freestyle swimmer
 26 April: Tinks Pottinger, equestrian eventer
 8 May: Richard Wilson, soccer player
 10 May: Chris Kuggeleijn, cricket player and coach
 23 May: Mark Shaw, rugby union footballer and selector
 18 August: Andrew Bennie, equestrian eventer
 29 September: Jenny Morris, singer
 8 November: Richard Curtis, screenwriter
 23 November: Bruce Edgar, cricketer
 12 December: Barry Pickering, soccer player
 16 December: Rodney Hide, politician
 Chris Finlayson, politician
 James Belich, historian
 (in Paris, France) Christopher Marshall, composer
 Douglas Wright, dancer and choreographer

Deaths
 17 April: Sir Alexander Young, politician.
 22 May: John Christopher Rolleston, politician.
 29 May:  Charlie Seeling, rugby footballer.
 17 June: Charles Boswell, politician.
 19 June: Bernard Martin, politician. 
 12 September: George Gillett, rugby player.
 21 November: Jim Thorn, labour leader and politician.

References

See also
List of years in New Zealand
Timeline of New Zealand history
History of New Zealand
Military history of New Zealand
Timeline of the New Zealand environment
Timeline of New Zealand's links with Antarctica

 
Years of the 20th century in New Zealand